Amma Nanna O Tamila Ammayi is a 2003 Indian Telugu-language sports drama film directed by Puri Jagannadh. The film stars Ravi Teja, Jayasudha, Asin Thottumkal (in her major Telugu debut), and Prakash Raj, while Ali, and Subbaraju play supporting roles. The film released on 19 April 2003.

It was first remade in Odia as Katha Deithili Maa Ku , Then in Tamil as M. Kumaran Son of Mahalakshmi, in Kannada as Maurya, and in Bhojpuri as Jigarwala. It was declared a Blockbuster the box-office and was one of the highest grossing Telugu films of all time during its release.

Plot 
Chandu's (Ravi Teja) entire life is about his mother Lakshmi (Jayasudha), a college lecturer. They together live in Hyderabad. When Chandu was a little boy, Lakshmi separated from her husband Raghuveer (Prakash Raj). Chandu is a great kickboxer and is very passionate about it. He later meets Mugambigambal (Asin) aka Chennai, a Tamil girl from Chennai, and starts to fall in love with her. Chandu's happy life is suddenly jolted when his mother dies of a heart attack. On her deathbed, she tells him to go to Visakhapatnam to meet Raghuveer, who is a kickboxing champion that won the championship six times in a row. Chandu goes to Visakhapatnam to meet him.

When Chandu reaches Visakhapatnam, he meets his father but sees that he has another wife, Shalini (Aishwarya), and a daughter named Swapna. He sees that he is happily settled with them and gets angry. He also gets a job as a janitor and juice provider at his father's kickboxing academy. Anand (Subbaraju) is Raghuveer's best student, and he is sure that Anand will win the championship. Unexpectedly, he sees that Mugaambigaambaal's family lives here and talks to her. Later, Chandu finds out that Anand makes Swapna pregnant and then abandons her. Anand also abandons Raghuveer by getting another master and other sponsors. Raghuveer is attacked by several of Anand's sponsors, and Chandu later beats them up, making Raghuveer find out that Chandu is a great kickboxer. Raghuveer also finds out that Chandu was also participating in the kickboxing championship. The rest of the story is how Raghuveer trains Chandu and wins the championship, how Chandu wins the heart of Mugaambigaambaal, and how he unites Swapna and Anand. After the fight, Chandu reveals he is half Tamilian and quarter Gujarati and Anglo Indian, much to Mugaambigaambaal's surprise when Chandu spoke Tamil, saying, "Shall we get married now?"

Cast

Production 

Initially Puri Jagannadh want to make this film with Pawan Kalyan with Jyothika as his pair in the lead, as both of them were  busy in with their works. Both of them backed out and finally Puri Jagannadh chosen his friend Raviteja and Asin as the lead and hits the bulls eye.

Awards 

Filmfare Awards
Filmfare Award for Best Actress – Telugu – Asin
Filmfare Award for Best Supporting Actress – Telugu – Jayasudha
Filmfare Award for Best Comedian – Telugu – Ali

Nandi Awards
Third Best Feature Film - Bronze — Puri Jagannadh
Best Character Actor – Prakash Raj 
Best Dialogue Writer  - Puri Jagannadh

Songs 

The audio launch was held at Viceroy Convention Hall, Viceroy Hotel on 7 April 2003. To suit the title, Poori Jagannath has invited 'Amma Nanna' (Mr. Venkat Rao & Mrs. Anjana) of Chiranjeevi to release the audio cassette. The tune of the song "Chennai Chandrama" was copied from "Mahaganapathim", a Kriti by Muthuswami Dikshitar in Nattai ragam. This song was used by Srikanth Deva as "Chennai Senthamizh" in the Tamil remake version M. Kumaran Son of Mahalakshmi. The song "Lunchkostava" is laced with Tamil lyrics for the female singer. The songs and background score was done by Chakri.

References

External links 
 

2000s sports drama films
2003 drama films
2003 films
Films directed by Puri Jagannadh
Films scored by Chakri
2000s Telugu-language films
Indian boxing films
Indian sports drama films
Telugu films remade in other languages